Rancho San Rafael was a  Spanish land grant in the San Rafael Hills, bordering the Los Angeles River and the Arroyo Seco in present-day Los Angeles County, southern California, given in 1784 to Jose Maria Verdugo.

Geography
The rancho includes the present day cities of Glendale, La Cañada Flintridge, Montrose, Verdugo City; and the city of Los Angeles neighborhoods of Atwater Village, Cypress Park, Eagle Rock, Garvanza, Glassell Park, Highland Park, and Mount Washington.

The rancho's boundaries were primarily defined by the Verdugo Mountains on the west, the Crescenta Valley and Rancho La Cañada on the north, the Arroyo Seco on the east, and the Los Angeles River on the south. The boundary followed north along the northeast bank of the L.A. River, and then wrapped westerly around present day Griffith Park to a point near the  Travel Town Museum there.

History
Corporal José María Verdugo (1751–1831), a Spanish soldier who had served with the 1769 Portola-Serra Expedition, received a provisional eight square league grant of the Rancho San Rafael in 1784, from his army commander Governor Pedro Fages, which was confirmed in 1798 by Governor Diego de Borica. In 1798 Verdugo retired from the army to become a full-time rancher.  Verdugo died in 1831 and he left his property to his surviving son Julio Antonio Verdugo (1789–1876) and daughter María Catalina Verdugo (1799–1837).

With the cession of California to the United States following the Mexican–American War, the 1848 Treaty of Guadalupe Hidalgo provided that the land grants would be honored. As required by the Land Act of 1851, a claim was filed with the Public Land Commission in 1852, confirmed by the Commission in 1855, and the grant was patented to Julio and Catalina Verdugo in 1882.

In 1857, Jonathan R. Scott traded Rancho La Cañada to Julio and Catalina Verdugo, heirs of Jose Maria Verdugo, for  acres on the west side of Rancho San Rafael - what is today Burbank. In 1861 Julio and Catalina Verdugo split the rancho between southern (Julio) and northern (Catalina) portions.

In 1861, Julio Verdugo mortgaged a substantial portion of the Rancho to Jacob Elias under terms that he could not afford. By the late 1860s, several parcels of Rancho San Rafael had been either sold, or lost due to foreclosures. Many individuals were claiming ownership to multiple sections of the rancho. In 1871, law partners Alfred Chapman and Andrew Glassell filed a lawsuit, known as "The Great Partition", against thirty-six separate defendants. The plaintiffs contended that there were numerous alleged property owners occupying tracts of land whose boundaries were illegally established. Once the validity of the claims were proven, a partition was demanded. Ultimately, Rancho San Rafael was divided into thirty-one sections given to twenty-eight different people, some of which included members of the Verdugo family.

Historic sites of the Rancho
 Casa Adobe De San Rafael: An 1865 hacienda-type adobe built by Tomas Avila Sanchez and Maria Sepulveda.
 Catalina Verdugo Adobe: An 1860 adobe built by Catalina's nephew, Teodoro Verdugo.  The property is the location of the Oak of Peace, where early Californio leaders, including Andres Pico, met in 1847 and decided to surrender to Lieutenant Colonel John C. Frémont.

See also
Ranchos of California
List of Ranchos of California
Ranchos of Los Angeles County

References

External links
Map of old Spanish and Mexican ranchos in Los Angeles County

San Rafael
San Rafael
History of Los Angeles
History of the San Fernando Valley
Northeast Los Angeles
Arroyo Seco (Los Angeles County)
Crescenta Valley
San Rafael Hills
Verdugo Mountains
Cypress Park, Los Angeles
Eagle Rock, Los Angeles
Glassell Park, Los Angeles
Glendale, California
Highland Park, Los Angeles
La Cañada Flintridge, California
Mount Washington, Los Angeles
1784 in Alta California
1784 establishments in Alta California
18th century in Los Angeles